Nirvana was a Yugoslav progressive rock band formed in Zagreb in 1970. Nirvana was a prominent act of the 1970s Yugoslav rock scene.

Band history

1970 - late 1970s
Nirvana was formed in Zagreb in 1970 by Krešimir Šoštar (guitar, formerly of the bands Mladi, Grešnici and Psalentas), Zdravko Štimac (drums, formerly of Mladi Lavovi and Psalentas) and Robert Krkač (bass guitar, formerly of Mladi and Psalentas). At the time of the band formation, Šoštar was a student of Indology, in which the other two were also interested, thus naming the band Nirvana. Initially the band performed covers of Taste, Grand Funk Railroad and other acts, and gained attention of the public as competent instrumentalists. 

Thanks to their reputation of a popular live act, the band appeared on numerous festivals throughout Yugoslavia. In 1972 the band performed on the first edition of BOOM Festival, held in Tivoli Hall in Ljubljana. The recordings of their songs "222" and "Pred tvojim vratima" ("At Your Door") appeared on the double live album Pop Festival Ljubljana 72 recorded on the festival. They performed on the second edition of the festival, also held in Tivoli Hall, with the recordings of their song "Klik tema broj 1" ("Click Theme No.1"), which they performed with singer Zdenka Kovačiček, appearing on the double live album Boom Pop Fest '73. In 1975 the band released their only record, the 7" single with the songs "Duh" ("Ghost") and "Kome da kažem" ("Who Should I Tell").

Nirvana ended their activity in the late 1970s.

Post-breakup
After Nirvana disbanded, Krkač continued his career in the cover bands Call 66 and Telephone Blues Band. With the band Telefon (Telephone) he recorded the 7" single with the songs "Dokle tako" ("For How Long") and "Komadi" ("Pieces"), released in 1981.

Krešimir Šoštar died in 1990.

Discography

Singles
"Duh" / "Kome da kažem" (1975)

Other appearances
"222" / "Pred tvojim vratima" (Pop Festival Ljubljana 72, 1972)
"Klik tema broj 1" (With Zdenka Kovačiček, Boom Pop Fest '73, 1973)

References

External links
Nirvana at Discogs

Croatian progressive rock groups
Yugoslav progressive rock groups
Musical trios
Musical groups established in 1970